Reginald George Whitton "Lloyd" Bennett (8 April 1916 – 16 April 1995) was an Australian rules footballer who played for Melbourne in the Victorian Football League (VFL). Bennett was nicknamed Lloyd after British Prime Minister David Lloyd George and won a Tasman Shields Trophy with Longford in 1940. He made his VFL debut in captain-coach Percy Beames's 200th game and made nine appearances in his only season for Melbourne.

References

Holmesby, Russell and Main, Jim (2007). The Encyclopedia of AFL Footballers. 7th ed. Melbourne: Bas Publishing.

External links

DemonWiki profile
WW2 Nominal Roll

1916 births
1995 deaths
Australian rules footballers from Tasmania
Melbourne Football Club players
Longford Football Club players
Royal Australian Air Force personnel of World War II
People from Devonport, Tasmania
Royal Australian Air Force airmen